Gene Gerrard (31 August 1892 – 1 June 1971) was an English film and stage actor, and occasional film director. He starred in light musical comedies but returned to his stage career by the 1930s.

He was born Eugene O'Sullivan and began as a cutter in his father's tailoring business in High Holborn, Central London.  He became an assistant to Mozart and made his stage début at the revue at the Alhambra Theatre of Variety, London in 1910 and his screen début in 1912 for the Hepworth Company. He served in the Great War.

He is billed as "The 'GENIE' of laughter" on the poster for The Wife's Family (1931).

Filmography
Actor
 Let's Love and Laugh (1931) (His talkie début)
 Out of the Blue (1931)
 The Wife's Family (1931)
 Brother Alfred (1932)
 Let Me Explain, Dear (1932)
 Lucky Girl (1932)
 The Love Nest (1933)
 Leave It to Me (1933)
 It's a Bet (1935)
 Royal Cavalcade (1935)
 Joy Ride (1935)
 The Guv'nor (1935)
 There Goes Susie (1935)
 No Monkey Business (1935)
 Faithful (1936)
 Such Is Life (1936)
 Where's Sally? (1936)
 Wake Up Famous (1937)
 Glamour Girl (1938)

Director 
 Out of the Blue (1931)
 Lucky Girl (1932)
 Let Me Explain, Dear (1931)
 Wake Up Famous (1937)
 It's in the Blood (1938)

Screenwriter
 Let Me Explain, Dear (1932)
 Lucky Girl (1932)
 The Love Nest (1933)
 Leave It to Me'' (1933)

References

External links

1892 births
1971 deaths
English male film actors
English male stage actors
Male actors from London
20th-century English male actors